Patrick Deeley (born 1953) is an Irish poet.

Patrick Deeley was born in Loughrea, County Galway. His poems have been widely published and anthologised in Ireland and abroad over the past forty years, and translated to French, Italian, Spanish and other languages.  He is the recipient of a number of awards including the inaugural Dermot Healy Poetry Prize and the 2019 Lawrence O'Shaughnessy Prize for Poetry.  His works of fiction for younger readers include 'The Lost Orchard', winner of The Eilis Dillon Award in 2001. His bestselling memoir, 'The Hurley Maker's Son', was published to wide critical acclaim by Doubleday Ireland/Transworld and shortlisted for the 2016 Irish Nonfiction Book of the Year Award.  He formerly worked as a primary school principal in Dublin.

Bibliography

 Intimate Strangers (1986)
 Names for Love (1990)
 Turane: The Hidden Village (1995)
 Decoding Samara (2000)
 The Lost Orchard (2001)
 The Bones of Creation (2008).
 Territoire  (2010)
 Groundswell: New and Selected Poems (2013)
 The Hurley Maker's Son(2015)
 The End of the World (2019)

External links
http://www.patrickdeeley.com
 http://www.theparlourreview.com/patrick-deeley
 https://web.archive.org/web/20091004182612/http://www.irishwriters-online.com/patrickdeeley.html
 http://www.munsterlit.ie/Southword/Issues/17A/Poetry/deeley_patrick.html
 http://www.obrien.ie/book326.cfm

1953 births
Irish poets
People from County Galway
People from Loughrea
Living people